Chunta (Aymara for  prolonged, lengthened, Quechua for a kind of palm,  also spelled Chonta) is a mountain in the Andes of Peru, about  high. Chunta is situated in the Ayacucho Region, Lucanas Province, Chipao District. Chunta lies north of Waytayuq and southeast of Pichqaqucha.

References 

Mountains of Peru
Mountains of Ayacucho Region